Durga Shanker Mishra (IAST: Durgā Śaṃkara Miśrā) (born 4 December 1961) is a 1984 batch Indian Administrative Service (IAS) officer of Uttar Pradesh cadre. He is the current Chief Secretary to Government of Uttar Pradesh. He was Housing and Urban Affairs Secretary and Chairman of the Delhi Metro Rail Corporation.

Education 
Mishra is a graduate (BTech) in electrical engineering from IIT Kanpur. He also holds a MBA degree in international business from the University of Western Sydney. Mishra also holds a postgraduate diploma in public policy from International Institute of Social Studies, The Hague. In addition, Mishra holds a postgraduate diploma in human resource management.

Career 
Mishra has served in various key positions for both the Government of India and the Government of Uttar Pradesh during his career, like as Principal Secretary (Appointment and Personnel), Secretary (Tax and Registration), Secretary (Health and Family Welfare), managing director of Uttar Pradesh Scheduled Caste Finance and Development Corporation (SDCFC), district magistrate and collector of Agra and Sonbhadra districts, Vice Chairman of Kanpur Development Authority and as the municipal commissioner of Kanpur in the Uttar Pradesh government, and as the Union Housing and Urban Affairs Secretary, additional secretary in the Ministry of Urban Development, joint secretary in the Ministry of Mines, joint secretary in the Ministry of Home Affairs and as the chief vigilance officer of the Airports Authority of India in the Indian government.

Housing and Urban Affairs Secretary 
Durga Shanker Mishra was appointed as the Union Housing and Urban Affairs Secretary by the Appointments Committee of the Cabinet, he assumed the office of Secretary on 21 June 2017.

References

External links 
 
 

1961 births
Living people
Indian Administrative Service officers
IIT Kanpur alumni
Western Sydney University alumni
International Institute of Social Studies alumni
People from Mau district